Daniel Álvarez may refer to:

 Daniel Álvarez (basketball) (born 1971), retired basketball player
 Daniel Alvarez (soccer, born 1978), retired American soccer player
 Daniel Álvarez (footballer, born 1994), Mexican football winger
 Daniel Alvarez (bassist) (fl. 2011-present), American metal bassist